Frank Washington Jarvis (August 31, 1878 in California, Pennsylvania – June 2, 1933 in Sewickley, Pennsylvania) was an American athlete, and the Olympic 100 m champion of 1900.

Jarvis, an AAU champion in the 100 y, was among the pre-race favourites for the 100 m at the 1900 Summer Olympics in Paris, but the hot favourite was American Arthur Duffey, who won the British Championships just prior to the Games.

In the heats, however, Jarvis and another American, Walter Tewksbury, posted times of 10.8, equaling the World Record. All three Americans qualified for the final, complemented by Stan Rowley of Australia. After a close first half of the final race, leading Duffey pulled a muscle, fell, and retired the race, leaving the three others to decide for the victory—Jarvis won.

At the same Olympics, Jarvis also competed in the triple jump and the standing triple jump (with no run-up), but did not achieve top classifications.

After his running career, Jarvis became a lawyer.

See also
List of Princeton University Olympians

References

External links 

1878 births
1933 deaths
American male sprinters
Athletes (track and field) at the 1900 Summer Olympics
Olympic gold medalists for the United States in track and field
Medalists at the 1900 Summer Olympics
USA Outdoor Track and Field Championships winners
People from California, Pennsylvania
Princeton Tigers athletes
University of Pittsburgh School of Law alumni
Sportspeople from Pennsylvania